The Eastern Intercollegiate Conference as an intercollegiate athletic conference of HBCUs that existed from 1953 to 1959. The conference's members were located in North Carolina, South Carolina, Tennessee, and Virginia.

Football champions

1953 – Elizabeth City State and Morristown (TN)
1954 – Elizabeth City State
1955 – Elizabeth City State

1956 – South Carolina Trade and Voorhees
1957 – Norfolk Polytechnic

1958 – South Carolina Trade
1959 – Norfolk Polytechnic

See also
List of defunct college football conferences

References

Defunct college sports conferences in the United States
College sports in North Carolina
College sports in South Carolina
College sports in Tennessee
College sports in Virginia